Nitin Bhille (born 18 August 1989) is an Indian first-class cricketer who plays for Railways.

References

External links
 

1989 births
Living people
Indian cricketers
Railways cricketers
People from Dharwad
Cricketers from Karnataka
Wicket-keepers